The 2017 FIBA Africa Under-16 Championship, alternatively the 5th Afrobasket U16, was an international basketball competition held in Vacoas-Phoenix, Mauritius from 13–22 July 2017. It served as the qualifier for the 2018 FIBA Under-17 Basketball World Cup.

Mali claimed their first-ever under-16 continental title by dethroning the defending champions Egypt in the final, 76–65. Both teams will represent FIBA Africa to the Under-17 Basketball World Cup next year.

Hosts selection
On 25 March 2016, FIBA Africa announced that Mauritius will be the organising country of the tournament.

Venue

Qualification

Participating teams
On the eve of the tournament, rosters were finalized for the following participating teams:

Format
The eight teams will be divided into two groups. The Group Phase consists of two legs: for each of the teams per group, they will face each other twice. The top two teams of each group will advance to the Semifinals, and the bottom two teams of each group will move on to the Classification Round, both will be played in a knockout format.

Draw
The draw for the main tournament was held on 12 July 2017 at Vacoas-Phoenix, Mauritius.

Group phase
All times are in Mauritius Time (UTC+4:00)

Group A

Group B

Classification round

Classification 5–8

Seventh place game

Fifth place game

Final round

Semifinals

Third place game

Final

Final ranking

Awards

All-Tournament Team
 Siriman Kanouté (MVP)
 Faiez Ghomrassi
 Aly Khalifa
 Thierry Nkundwa
 Oumar Ballo

Statistical leaders

Individual tournament highs

Points

Rebounds

Assists

External links
Official Website

Notes

References

2017
2017 FIBA Under-16 African Championship
International sports competitions hosted by Mauritius
Bask
July 2017 sports events in Africa